Naranjito is a town and municipality of Puerto Rico located in the central region of the island, south of Toa Alta; north of Barranquitas and Comerío; east of Corozal; and west of Bayamón. Naranjito is spread over 7 barrios and Naranjito Pueblo (the downtown area and the administrative center). It is part of the San Juan-Caguas-Guaynabo Metropolitan Statistical Area.

History
The intention to form the municipality of Naranjito began in 1810. After a series of major incidents with powerful political interests of the time, on December 3, 1824, Don Braulio Morales successfully founded the town of Naranjito. The town was founded in the neighborhood of the same name, on a land donated by Doña Manuela Rivera and Don Braulio Morales. Morales was named "Captain Settler" and at the same time was appointed mayor of the town in development. The name "Naranjito" is derived from a small orange tree that served as a reference point for travelers looking for in the shortest way to the town of Toa Alta. At the time of its foundation, Naranjito consisted of five barrios/districts: Lomas, Guadiana, Achiote, Nuevo and Cedro. Cedro was divided in 1853 in Cedro Arriba and Cedro Abajo. The municipality's main urban zone is composed by the San Miguel, San Antonio and San Cristobal districts.

Puerto Rico was ceded by Spain in the aftermath of the Spanish–American War under the terms of the Treaty of Paris of 1898 and became a territory of the United States. In 1899, the United States Department of War conducted a census of Puerto Rico finding that the population of Naranjito was 8,101.

On September 20, 2017 Hurricane Maria struck Puerto Rico. Naranjito was left in complete devastation and isolation, with no electrical power, no communication and no physical access due to destroyed highways. The Guadiana River caused severe flooding in the urban area of Naranjito. The storm triggered numerous landslides in Naranjito. Elderly, especially, struggled to recover.

Geography 

Naranjito is located in the central mountainous region.

Hydrography
Rivers and streams of Naranjito include Río Cañas, Río Cibuco, Río Grande de Manatí, Río Guadiana and Río Mavilla.

Barrios

Like all municipalities of Puerto Rico, Naranjito is subdivided into barrios.

Achiote
Anones
Nuevo
Cedro Abajo
Cedro Arriba
Guadiana
Lomas, also known as Lomas Garcia
Naranjito barrio-pueblo

Sectors

Barrios (which are like minor civil divisions) in turn are further subdivided into smaller local populated place areas/units called sectores (sectors in English). The types of sectores may vary, from normally sector to urbanización to reparto to barriada to residencial, among others.

Special Communities

 (Special Communities of Puerto Rico) are marginalized communities whose citizens are experiencing a certain amount of social exclusion. A map shows these communities occur in nearly every municipality of the commonwealth. Of the 742 places that were on the list in 2014, the following barrios, communities, sectors, or neighborhoods were in Naranjito: La Pajona (Los Alvarado) in Cedro Arriba, Las Parcelas in Lomas García, Los Pampers (Sico Martínez) in Lomas García, Sector Benito Nieves/Los Quilés in Lomas García, Comunidad Lago La Plata, La Colina, San Antonio y San Cristóbal, Casco Urbano (Las Barriadas), Parcelas Hevia, Sector Mulitas, Comunidad Cayito Ríos, Lomas Jaguas, Los Pelusa in Cedro Abajo, Comunidades Riíto 1 y II in Cedro Arriba, Comunidad El Palmar, Los López in Cedro Abajo, Fondo del Saco in Achiote and La Sabana in Cedro Abajo.

Demographics

Tourism

Landmarks and places of interest
Anones Park
Cancha Gelito Ortega
Cedro Abajo Falls (Las Lagrimas Falls)
La Marina Boardwalk
La Plata Lake
Las Avispas Hills
Municipal Swimming Pool
Trovador Plaza
Mirador de Anones
Puente Atirantado Jesús Izcoa Moure
El Cerro Community

Economy
Traditionally the main agricultural crops of Naranjito are coffee and the tobacco. In recent years have borne fruits such as bananas, oranges, papayas, and other tropical fruits; also in the town the poultry factory has been very popular, specifically the dairy cattle (fresh milk). Naranjito has many factories, most of these factories make garments (clothing).

Culture

Festivals and events
Naranjito celebrates its patron saint festival in September. The  is a religious and cultural celebration that generally features parades, games, artisans, amusement rides, regional food, and live entertainment.

Other festivals and events celebrated in Naranjito include:
Mothers Day - May
San Antonio Day - June
Chango Festival - June
Anon Festival - June
Volleyball Tournament - February - June
Archangel Saint Michael Day - September
The Turkey Marathon - November

Sports
The Naranjito Changos, better known as Los Changos De Naranjito, are a professional male volleyball team based in Naranjito. The team is one of the most successful sports franchises in Puerto Rico.

Government

All municipalities in Puerto Rico are administered by a mayor, elected every four years. On November 4, 2008, Orlando Ortíz Chevres (of the New Progressive Party), won the elections.

The city belongs to the Puerto Rico Senatorial district VI, which is represented by two senators. In 2012, Miguel Pereira Castillo and Angel M. Rodríguez were elected as District Senators.

Transportation 
There are 19 bridges in Naranjito.

Symbols
The  has an official flag and coat of arms.

Flag
Naranjito's flag consists of an orange flag crossed by two narrow green stripes close to the superior and inferior edges. The orange color in the flag symbolizes the town of Naranjito (little orange tree), while the green symbolizes its green mountains.

Coat of arms
The coat of arms is a red cross, the symbol of the angel Saint Michael, patron of Naranjito. The globe with the cross symbolizes the power and sovereignty of God. The gold and red stripes that appear in the second and third quarters, constitute the primitive baton of the Guadiana lineage. The lily twigs are a tribute of Saint Anthony of Padua, confessor and doctor of the Church. The orange tree represents the small tree that gave the town's name, Naranjito. The crown is symbol of moral unit of the town.

Education
Naranjito includes several public and private schools distributed through several regions. Public education is handled by the Puerto Rico Department of Education

Elementary schools 
Bernarda Robles De Hevia
Don Manolo Rivera
Felipa Sanchez Cruzado
Jose Archilla Cabrera
Josefina Marrero
Francisco Roque Muñoz
Rosa Luz Zayas
Silvestre Martinez

Middle and junior high schools 
Coleen Vazquez Urrutia
Mercedes Rosado
 S.U. Adolfo Garcia
 S.U. Fidel G Padilla
 S.U. Pedro Fernandez

High schools
Francisco Morales
Vocacional Rubén Rodríguez Figueroa

Private schools
Academia Santa Teresita (K-12)

Media
A foot pursuit of the movie Fast & Furious 5 in which Dominic Toretto (Vin Diesel), Mia Toretto (Jordana Brewster) and Brian O'Connor (Paul Walker) are chased across favela rooftops by Luke Hobbs (Dwayne Johnson) and his team was filmed over the course of a week in Naranjito. The scene was considered difficult to shoot, as pathways were slippery from moist tropical heat and the scene involved actors and stunt doubles running while avoiding dogs, chickens and other stray animals loose in the area. To capture the scene, a 420-foot cable-camera rig was used to allow for a fast moving, birds-eye view of the action, and cameras on cranes were set up on rooftops and in alleyways. Walker and Brewster made multiple takes of the conclusion of the scene, requiring them to jump nearly 30 feet from a building onto a waiting safety mat. In total the production employed 236 technicians, 13,145 extras, and generated 16,824 room nights at hotels, contributing $27 million to the local community.

Notable people
 Francisco López Cruz, an important musicologist, musician, composer, and educator that dedicated his life to promote Puerto Rican Folk music.
 Yazaira Lopez, the winner of Va por Ti co-production of Univision and Televisa 2014
 Christian Nieves, an internationally known cuatro player
 Barbara Serrano, recognized writer and first runner-up of Miss World Puerto Rico 2001.

Books about Naranjito
El Chango. Apuntes Historicos del Pueblo de Naranjito-1824-1998, Author: Silvestre J. Morales 1999

See also

List of Puerto Ricans
History of Puerto Rico
Did you know-Puerto Rico?

References

External links
 
 Puerto Rico Government Directory - Naranjito
 

 
Municipalities of Puerto Rico
Populated places established in 1824
San Juan–Caguas–Guaynabo metropolitan area
1824 establishments in North America